The Mighty is a superhero comic book published by DC Comics. It was written by Peter Tomasi and Keith Champagne.

The book was mentioned as being adapted by Paramount Pictures into a feature film, which was to be released in 2015 but no word of it came ever since.

References 

Superhero comics
DC Comics titles